Emmanuel Tony Agbaji (born 21 November 1992) is a Nigerian professional footballer who plays as a centre-back for V.League 1 club Nam Định.

Club career

Lobi Stars
Emmanuel was born in Nigeria. Since his childhood In 2009, he joined Lobi Stars Academy in Makurdi, Nigeria, then signed his first professional contract with Lobi Stars senior team in 2011. Emmanuel is the longest-serving player for Lobi Stars and was the team's captain on several occasions. He has also won in the Nigerian Premier League in 2018 and played CAF Champions League for Lobi Stars.

Nam Định
In January 2019, he moved to Vietnam and signed with CLB Nam Định. In the 2019 season of V-League, Emmanuel played 24 matches in the league and was an instrumental part of the Nam Định squad. In January 2020, Emmanuel extended his contract with Nam Định for an additional season.

Honours

Club
Lobi Stars
 Nigerian Professional Football League: 2018
 Nigerian Super Cup: 2018

References 

Living people
1992 births
Nigerian footballers
Association football forwards
Lobi Stars F.C. players
Nam Định F.C. players
V.League 1 players
Nigeria Professional Football League players
Nigerian expatriate footballers
Nigerian expatriate sportspeople in Vietnam
Expatriate footballers in Vietnam